Romanza is the first compilation album by Italian singer Andrea Bocelli, released internationally in 1997.

Although a compilation, Romanza is considered Bocelli's breakthrough album and remains his most commercially successful to date, topping charts all across Europe and Latin America. With over 17 million copies sold worldwide, it is the best-selling Italian album of all-time, and also one of the best-selling albums by a recording artist in the 1990s.

Background
The album is a compilation of Bocelli's two previous pop albums, Il Mare Calmo della Sera, released in 1994, and Bocelli, released in 1995.

Promotion

North America
Being Bocelli's first album released in the United States and Canada, the album and Bocelli himself, were heavily promoted. This included Bocelli being featured in Hotel Bellagio's commercials in North America, as well as his voice being heard on its Fountain show.

PBS also played a big part in Bocelli' early success in the States, with the airing of A Night in Tuscany, Bocelli's first Great Performances special, of a concert filmed in 1997, in his native Tuscany.

Europe
In August, Bocelli first appeared at the Puccini Festival in Torre del Lago, Italy, and then at the World Youth Festiva, in Paris, where he sang, in the presence of Pope John Paul II, to an audience of 800,000 people.

In 1997, Bocelli won three major awards in Germany. On March 3, Bocelli appeared in Hamburg, with Sarah Brightman to receive the ECHO music award for "Best Single of the Year", for "Time to Say Goodbye", on September 14, he received an ECHO Klassik, in Munich, for "Best seller of the year", for his previous album, Viaggio Italiano, and finally, on October 25, Bocelli received a Bambi award, an annual television and media prize awarded by the German media company Hubert Burda Media, in Cologne. All three ceremonies were broadcast live in Germany.

The album was also supported in Germany, by a series of concerts, including 22 open-air concerts in the country, as well as an indoor concert in Oberhausen. The German Tour, started in Locarno, Switzerland, on June 6, and ended in Berlin, on August 30, with other venues including, Hannover, Hamburg, Münster, Rügen, Koblenz, Aachen, Wiesbaden, Kiel, Stuttgart, Leverkusen, Baden-Baden, Dresden, Coburg, Leipzig, München, Kassel, Halle, Essen, Aschaffenburg, Nuremberg.

In the United Kingdom, Bocelli held a concert with Sarah Brightman, at the Royal Albert Hall, in London, in the fall.

Back in Italy, on September 27, Bocelli sang again before the Pope at the International Eucharistic Congress, in Bologna. On October 19, he sang at the TeleFood benefit concert held in Vatican City, and organised by the Food and Agriculture Organization to raise awareness about world hunger.

On December 15 and 20, 1997, Bocelli held a concert in Palais Omnisports de Paris-Bercy, in Paris, France, and a concert in Seefeld, Austria.

Bocelli also performed the French version of "Vivo per lei" with French singer, Hélène Ségara, on television programmes in France and Belgium, the Spanish version of song with Spanish singer, Marta Sánchez, on television programmes in Spain, and the German version of the song with German singer, Judy Weiss, on television programmes in Germany and Switzerland. A music video for each of those three versions was released in those countries. In addition, a music video of the Portuguese version of the song, sang with Brazilian singer Sandy, was also released in Brazil and Portugal, contributing to Romanzas success in the two countries.

Romanza (20th Anniversary Edition)
In 2016, a new special edition of the album was released worldwide to celebrate 20 years since the album's original release. The original album has been remastered and including also three bonus tracks.

Track listing

Commercial performance
First in Europe, then charts around the world, the album amassed a multitude of platinum and multi-platinum awards, outselling even Bocelli's 1995 album, Bocelli, with worldwide sales in excess of 17 million copies.

With more than 350,000 units sold in Switzerland, it is the second best-selling album in history there, and with over two million copies sold in France, it is among the top 10 best-selling albums ever in the country.

It also received triple platinum status in the United States with 4.2 million copies sold, being Bocelli's first album released in the States, and Diamond status in Canada. Actual sales stand at 1,133,000 copies across Canada according to Nielsen, making Romanza the best-selling album by a foreign artist of the Nielsen SoundScan era, and the fourth best-selling overall, in Canada.

To date, the album remains Bocelli's most commercially successful, and is considered his breakthrough album, launching his career worldwide.

Charts

Weekly charts

Year-end charts

Sales and certifications

PBS Special

A Night in Tuscany, Bocelli's first PBS Great Performances special, filmed in 1997, was designed to promote the album.

The concert held in his native Tuscany, at the Piazza dei Cavalieri, in Pisa, saw Bocelli perform two opera duets with soprano Nuccia Focile, sing "Miserere" with Italian rock star Zucchero, who discovered him in 1992, and finally "Time to Say Goodbye" with English soprano Sarah Brightman. The DVD of the full program was internationally released on November 10, 1998.

See also
List of best-selling albums
 List of best-selling albums in Argentina
 List of best-selling albums in Brazil
 List of best-selling albums in Canada
 List of best-selling albums in Italy
 List of best-selling albums in France
 List of diamond-certified albums in Canada
 List of European number-one hits of 1997

References

External links
 [ Romanza on the Billboard charts] (United States and Canada)
 Romanza on Ultratop.be

Andrea Bocelli compilation albums
1997 compilation albums
Albums produced by Frank Peterson